The Magdalena spiny rat (Proechimys magdalenae) is a species of rodent in the family Echimyidae. It is endemic to Colombia.

Phylogeny
Morphological characters and mitochondrial cytochrome b DNA sequences showed that P. magdalenae belongs to the so-called trinitatus group of Proechimys species, and shares closer phylogenetic affinities with the other members of this clade: P. trinitatus, P. mincae, P. guairae, P. poliopus, P. chrysaeolus, P. urichi, and P. hoplomyoides.

References

Proechimys
Endemic fauna of Colombia
Mammals of Colombia
Mammals described in 1948
Taxa named by Philip Hershkovitz
Taxonomy articles created by Polbot
Taxobox binomials not recognized by IUCN